Tamim  may refer to
Tamim bin Hamad Al Thani, Emir of Qatar   
Tamim Iqbal, Bangladeshi cricketer   
Tamim (name)
Tamim (cricketer), Afghan cricketer
Banu Tamim, one of the main tribes of Arabia
Hotat Bani Tamim, a Saudi Arabian town

See also
Tamimi (disambiguation)